Araklı (from Greek "Ηράκλεια" - Erakleia) is a town and district of Trabzon Province in the Black Sea region of Turkey. The mayor is Recep Çebi (AKP). Name Arakli is believed to be derived from "the castle in the middle" in turkish 'Arakale'.

See also
 Araklı Arena
 World Trade Center Trabzon 
 Trabzon Museum
 Trabzon
 Chepni
 Hemshin
 Pontic Greeks
 Kadirga Festival

References

External links

District governor's official website 
A local online guide to Araklı
A local website about Araklı

Populated places in Trabzon Province
Fishing communities in Turkey
Populated coastal places in Turkey
Districts of Trabzon Province